Catocala violenta is a moth of the family Erebidae. It is found from Colorado to Arizona, east to Texas and into Mexico.

The wingspan is 70–80 mm. Adults are on wing from July to August depending on the location. There is one generation per year.

The larvae feed on Quercus gambeli.

References

External links
Species info

violenta
Moths described in 1880
Moths of North America